Wildrose is a city in Williams County, North Dakota, United States. The population was 115 at the 2020 census. Wildrose was founded in 1910.

Geography
Wildrose is located at  (48.630318, −103.183464).

Demographics

2010 census
As of the census of 2010, there were 110 people, 63 households, and 27 families residing in the city. The racial makeup of the city was 96.4% White, 2.7% Native American, and 0.9% from two or more races. Hispanic or Latino of any race were 4.5% of the population.

There were 63 households, of which 14.3% had children under the age of 18 living with them, 36.5% were married couples living together, 6.3% had a female householder with no husband present, and 57.1% were non-families. 47.6% of all households were made up of individuals, and 22.2% had someone living alone who was 65 years of age or older. The average household size was 1.75 and the average family size was 2.52.

The median age in the city was 52.6 years. 12.7% of residents were under the age of 18; 3.5% were between the ages of 18 and 24; 14.5% were from 25 to 44; 46.4% were from 45 to 64; and 22.7% were 65 years of age or older. The gender makeup of the city was 49.1% male and 50.9% female.

2000 census
As of the census of 2000, there were 129 people, 63 households, and 36 families residing in the city. The population density was 464.4 people per square mile (177.9/km). There were 102 housing units at an average density of 367.2 per square mile (140.7/km). The racial makeup of the city was 96.90% White and 3.10% Asian.

There were 63 households, out of which 19.0% had children under the age of 18 living with them, 44.4% were married couples living together, 14.3% had a female householder with no husband present, and 41.3% were non-families. 41.3% of all households were made up of individuals, and 15.9% had someone living alone who was 65 years of age or older. The average household size was 2.05 and the average family size was 2.76.

In the city, the population was spread out, with 22.5% under the age of 18, 4.7% from 18 to 24, 24.8% from 25 to 44, 22.5% from 45 to 64, and 25.6% who were 65 years of age or older. The median age was 43 years. For every 100 females, there were 101.6 males. For every 100 females age 18 and over, there were 104.1 males.

The median income for a household in the city was $19,167, and the median income for a family was $21,250. Males had a median income of $36,875 versus $17,250 for females. The per capita income for the city was $11,052. There were 19.4% of families and 13.5% of the population living below the poverty line, including 11.1% of under eighteens and 12.8% of those over 64.

Climate
This climatic region is typified by large seasonal temperature differences, with warm to hot (and often humid) summers and cold (sometimes severely cold) winters.  According to the Köppen Climate Classification system, Wildrose has a humid continental climate, abbreviated "Dfb" on climate maps.

Education
It is within the Nesson School District (Ray Public School).

References

External links
Wildrose 50th anniversary: a history of Wildrose, North Dakota, 1910-1960 from the Digital Horizons website

Cities in Williams County, North Dakota
Cities in North Dakota
Populated places established in 1910